Toni Dahlman (born 3 September 1979) is a Finnish former professional ice hockey player. He played 22 games in the National Hockey League with the Ottawa Senators.

Playing career
Dahlman began playing hockey in the first division Kiekko-Kissat in the 1996–97 season, and moved on to the Jokerit junior team, and eventually to Jokerit for the 1998–99 season. In 2000 Dahlman transferred to Ilves and went on to win the bronze medal and the 2001 Jarmo Wasama memorial trophy as best rookie.

He was drafted by the Ottawa Senators of the National Hockey League as their 9th round pick in the 2001 NHL Entry Draft, 286th overall.

Dahlman played two seasons in North America firstly in 2001–02 with the Grand Rapids Griffins of the American Hockey League and ten games with the Ottawa Senators. In the 2002–03 season, Dahlman played briefly for Ottawa before returning to the AHL with affiliate, the Binghamton Senators. Over his 22 NHL games Dahlman only scored one goal and assist.

Dahlman returned to Finland for the 2003–04 season and represented Ilves in a total of 41 games, scoring 9 goals and 18 assists. He returned to Jokerit for the 2004–05 season, where he scored 16 goals and 7 assists, sharing the top goal scorer spot on his team with Glen Metropolit and Marko Jantunen. Jokerit won the silver medal that season.

On 20 April 2011, Dahlman left the Grizzly Adams after a finals appearance in the Deutsche Eishockey Liga, and returned to Austria on a one-year contract to play with Graz.

After a two-year stint in Kazakhstan with Arystan Temirtau and a one-year stint with the VHL's Sputnik Nizhny Tagil, he signed with Ciarko PBS Bank STS Sanok in Poland for the 2015–16 season.

International play

Dahlman represented Finland in the IIHF 1998 under-20's world championships where they won the gold medal. He played in six games and scored two goals.

Awards
 2001 -Awarded the Jarmo Wasama memorial trophy as the best rookie in the SM-liiga.

Career statistics

Regular season and playoffs

International

References

External links

1979 births
Arystan Temirtau players
Binghamton Senators players
Finnish ice hockey right wingers
Grand Rapids Griffins players
Graz 99ers players
Jokerit players
HIFK (ice hockey) players
HK Acroni Jesenice players
Ilves players
KalPa players
Oulun Kärpät players
Living people
Lukko players
Mora IK players
Ottawa Senators draft picks
Ottawa Senators players
Ice hockey people from Helsinki
Sputnik Nizhny Tagil players
Grizzlys Wolfsburg players
Braehead Clan players
KH Sanok players
Finnish expatriate ice hockey players in Scotland
Finnish expatriate ice hockey players in Germany
Finnish expatriate ice hockey players in the United States
Finnish expatriate ice hockey players in Canada
Finnish expatriate ice hockey players in Kazakhstan
Finnish expatriate ice hockey players in Poland
Finnish expatriate ice hockey players in Sweden
Finnish expatriate ice hockey players in Russia
Finnish expatriate ice hockey players in Slovenia
Finnish expatriate ice hockey players in Austria